Gloeomucro is a genus of fungi in the Hydnaceae family. The widespread genus contains nine species.

References

External links

Cantharellales
Agaricomycetes genera
Taxa named by Ron Petersen